Wilton Bezerra da Silva Neto (born 19 September 1979) is a Brazilian football manager. He is the current assistant manager of Paysandu.

Career
Born in Recife, Pernambuco, Bezerra began his career as a youth manager at Santa Cruz in 2005. In 2010, when Dado Cavalcanti became the first team manager of Santa, he became his assistant, and subsequently worked along Cavalcanti as his assistant at several clubs for nearly ten years.

On 10 May 2018, Bezerra ended his relationship with Paysandu to join Sport Recife as an assistant manager of under-20 and under-23 squads. On 17 July, however, he was named manager of the under-20 side.

On 12 February 2019, Bezerra was appointed manager of América-PE. On 19 February 2020, he took over São Paulo Crystal.

Bezerra was announced as manager of SP Crystal for the 2021 season, but was dismissed on 10 March of that year before the season started. He returned to Paysandu on 8 April, again as an assistant.

Bezerra was an interim manager of Papão in May 2021 after Itamar Schülle was sacked, but returned to his previous role after Vinícius Eutrópio was appointed manager. On 18 October, he was definitely appointed manager after Roberto Fonseca was sacked.

References

External links
 

1979 births
Living people
Brazilian football managers
Campeonato Brasileiro Série C managers
América Futebol Clube (PE) managers
Paysandu Sport Club managers
Sportspeople from Recife